Maria Sergeyevna Temnikova is a Russian swimmer. She won the gold medal at the 2019 European Short Course Swimming Championships in 200 m breaststroke.

References 

1995 births
Living people
Russian female breaststroke swimmers
Sportspeople from Yekaterinburg
Medalists at the 2017 Summer Universiade
Universiade bronze medalists for Russia
Universiade medalists in swimming
European Aquatics Championships medalists in swimming
Swimmers at the 2020 Summer Olympics